The 1964 Southwark Council election took place on 7 May 1964 to elect members of Southwark London Borough Council in London, England. The whole council was up for election and the Labour party gained control of the council.

Background
These elections were the first to the newly formed borough. Previously elections had taken place in the Metropolitan Borough of Bermondsey, Metropolitan Borough of Camberwell and Metropolitan Borough of Southwark. These boroughs were joined to form the new London Borough of Southwark by the London Government Act 1963.

A total of 144 candidates stood in the election for the 60 seats being contested across 22 wards. These included a full slate from the Labour party, while the Conservative and Liberal parties stood 57 and 16 respectively. Other candidates included 11 from the Communist party. There were 14 three-seat wards, 7 two-seat wards and 1 four-seat ward.

This election had aldermen as well as directly elected councillors.  Labour got all 10 aldermen.

The Council was elected in 1964 as a "shadow authority" but did not start operations until 1 April 1965.

Election result
The results saw Labour gain the new council with a majority of 48 after winning 54 of the 60 seats. Overall turnout in the election was 23.6%. This turnout included 599 postal votes.

|}

Ward results

Abbey

Alleyn

Bellenden

Bricklayers

Browning

Brunswick

Burgess

Cathedral

Chaucer

Consort

Dockyard

Faraday

Friary

Lyndhurst

Newington

Riverside

Rotherhithe

Ruskin

Rye

St Giles

The College

Waverley

See also
1964 Greater London Council election

References

Council elections in the London Borough of Southwark
1964 London Borough council elections